The 2020–21 season was the 91st season in the existence of Girona FC and the club's second consecutive season in the second division of Spanish football. In addition to the domestic league, Girona participated in this season's edition of the Copa del Rey. The season covered the period from 24 August 2020 to 30 June 2021.

Players

First-team squad

Reserve team

Out on loan

Pre-season and friendlies

Competitions

Overview

Segunda División

League table

Results summary

Results by round

Matches
The league fixtures were announced on 31 August 2020.

Promotion play-offs

Copa del Rey

Notes

References

External links

Girona FC seasons
Girona
2020–21 in Catalan football